Graham Zanker (born 16 December 1947) is Emeritus Professor of Classics at the University of Canterbury and an affiliate at the University of Adelaide.

He has published widely on Hellenistic poetry and art, Homeric ethics, and Virgilian epic.

Education 
Zanker received his B.A. from the University of Adelaide before proceeding to Gonville and Caius College, Cambridge, where he was awarded a Ph.D. in Classical Philology.

He has undertaken research at the universities of Cambridge, Oxford, Tübingen, Heidelberg, and Cincinnati, and been a resident scholar at the Fondation Hardt (Geneva), Center for Hellenic Studies, Institute of Classical Studies. He has also been an academic visitor at the Institute for Advanced Study.

Career 
Zanker's first book, Realism in Alexandrian Poetry: A Literature and Its Audience (1987), was a groundbreaking investigation of the interrelation of Hellenistic poetry and art. Zanker then moved to Homeric ethics in The Heart of Achilles: Characterization and Personal Ethics in the Iliad (1994), amending the schematic view of the psychological drives behind the behavior of the Homeric heroes by (e.g.) focusing on the reconciliation scene between Achilles and Priam in Iliad 24. He then returned to the interaction of Hellenistic art and literature in Modes of Viewing in Hellenistic Poetry and Art (2004). He has recently written on Stoic fate in Virgil's Aeneid.

He has also translated Thomas Szlezak's Platon Lesen (Reading Plato, 2005), and authored an edition, translation, and commentary to Herodas’ Mimiambs (2009).

Zanker is currently working on a collaboration on Ch. G. Heyne's De Genio Saeculi Ptolemaeorum (1763), establishing its place in modern concepts of Hellenistic civilization.

Selected publications 
 
 
 
 Zanker, Graham (2023). Fate and the Hero in Virgil's Aeneid; Stoic World Fate and Human Responsibility. Cambridge University Press. ISBN  9781009319850.

References

External links 
 Zanker at the University of Canterbury, including list of publications

Australian expatriates in the United Kingdom
Academic staff of the University of Canterbury
University of Adelaide alumni
Alumni of Gonville and Caius College, Cambridge
Australian classical scholars
Australian expatriates in New Zealand
1947 births
Living people